Eagle Newspapers may refer to one of these U.S. newspaper publishers:

Eagle Newspapers (New York)
Eagle Newspapers (Oregon)

See also
 The Eagle (newspaper), a list of newspapers